Tagliacozzo is a town and comune in the province of L'Aquila, Abruzzo, central Italy.

History

Tagliacozzo lies in an area inhabited in early historic times by the Aequi and the Marsi, although the first mentions of the town dates from the 11th century AD. Later it was a possession on the Orsini, who established a mint here. They were succeeded by the Colonna (local lords including Prospero and Marcantonio Colonna), who held the Duchy of Tagliacozzo until 1806.

Near the modern city (more precisely, near Scurcola Marsicana) was fought the Battle of Tagliacozzo (1268) between Conradin of Hohenstaufen and Charles I of Anjou, which resulted in Conradin's defeat and eventual execution.

Main sights
The Palazzo Ducale (Ducal Palace), built at the end of the 14th century by Roberto Orsini.
The Convent of St. Francis, housing the tomb of Tommaso da Celano.
Museo Orientale, with collections of Egyptian, Ethiopian and Eastern findings.
13th century fountain in Piazza dell'Obelisco, a national monument.
Sanctuary of Maria Santissima dell'Oriente, on a hill  from town. It is cited as early as the 14th century.

People
Andrea Argoli (1570–1657)

Notes and references

External links 
Page on Tagliacozzo in the Borghi più belli d'Italia website
Images of Tagliacozzo

Hilltowns in Abruzzo
Marsica
Tagliacozzo
Ski areas and resorts in Italy